The opalfish, Hemerocoetes monopterygius, is a duckbill of the genus Hemerocoetes, found only around New Zealand, at depths of between .

Gallery

References

 
 
 Tony Ayling & Geoffrey Cox, Collins Guide to the Sea Fishes of New Zealand,  (William Collins Publishers Ltd, Auckland, New Zealand 1982) 
 Wade Doak, A Photographic Guide to Sea Fishes of New Zealand, (New Holland Publishers (NZ) Ltd, Auckland, New Zealand 2003) 

Percophidae
Endemic marine fish of New Zealand
Fish described in 1801
Taxobox binomials not recognized by IUCN